Quantex Microsystems was a direct-PC manufacturer based in Somerset, New Jersey, founded in 1984.  Although it never matched the sales volumes of the largest PC retailers, their products met wide acceptance by customers.  It filed for Chapter 11 bankruptcy protection on August 17, 2000, when its key supplier, Fountain Technologies, who also supplied computers for the Pionex, Inteva, and CyberMax brands, filed for Chapter 11 bankruptcy protection.

Quantex computers were built to a high standard, and regularly won awards in many computer publications.  Even up to the point that they filed for Chapter 11, the awards were still being dealt out.  The attraction for many was that Quantex combined high build quality, great technical support (before the financial trouble), brand-name components and above all lower cost than most rivals. 

Quantex's European operations were taken care of in the Stevenage, UK.  The UK operation continued for several months after the US company declared bankruptcy, and were easily contactable during that period.  The inevitable happened, though, and Quantex UK slipped away.  In 2001, a company called Quantex Computers UK Ltd. started to advertise in UK computer magazines, based at the same location as the UK office of the original Quantex Microsystems but denying any links to the old company.  They disappeared after only a few months, and their website was maintained for a year or so after that by a third party.

Company leaders
 M. T. Chang and Min Yau Chang  President and Co-Founder respectively
 Stan Swearingen, Jr.  former president and CEO
 Steven Markin  VP and General Counsel

External links
 Quantex Zone
 "Quantex, Cybermax Go Silent" - 2000 August 17 - PC World
 "What to Do When You Pick a Lemon" - 1999 April 20 - PC World (bad link as of 2015 Aug 4)
 Quantex W-1500 notebook computer - one of the last products before bankruptcy
 Quantex Microsystems UK (bad link as of 2015 Aug 4)

American companies established in 1984
American companies disestablished in 2000
Companies based in Somerset County, New Jersey
Computer companies established in 1984
Computer companies disestablished in 2000
Defunct companies based in New Jersey
Defunct computer companies of the United States
Defunct computer hardware companies